Truthfulness may refer to:

 Honesty - a moral character of a human being, related to telling the truth
 Accuracy - the propensity of information to be correct
 Strategyproofness - a property of a mechanism in game-theory, related to encouraging the participants to act according to their true preferences.

See also:
 Truth - a concept most often used to mean in accord with fact or reality.
 Truthiness - a quality characterizing a "truth" that a person making an argument or assertion claims to know intuitively.
 Truthlikeness - a philosophical concept that distinguishes between the relative and apparent truth and falsity of assertions and hypotheses.